NGC 5750 is a barred spiral galaxy with an active galactic nucleus in the constellation Virgo. It was discovered on April 11, 1787 by the astronomer William Herschel. It is a member of the NGC 5746 Group of galaxies, itself one of the Virgo III Groups strung out to the east of the Virgo Supercluster of galaxies.

References

External links
 

Barred spiral galaxies
5750
Virgo (constellation)